Robert E. "Bob" Holthus (June 24, 1934 – November 22, 2011) was an American Thoroughbred racehorse trainer. As a second generation trainer, Holthus learned the profession from his father, Paul Holthus.

Holthus is the all-time winningest trainer at Oaklawn Park and as of 2005 had won nine trainer's titles there. He also won training titles at Chicago's Arlington Park and Hawthorne Race Course, the Detroit Race Course, Ellis Park Racecourse in Henderson, Kentucky, Louisiana Downs in Bossier City, Louisiana plus a fall meeting at Turfway Park in the suburbs of Cincinnati, Ohio.

Bob Holthus was the trainer for the Kentucky Derby entrants Greater Good and Pro Prado but is best known nationally as the trainer of Pure Clan and Lawyer Ron from the start of his career in 2005 until October 2006.

Bob Holthus and his widow Bonnie owned the Kilkerry Farm at Royal, Arkansas near Hot Springs at the time of his death.

References

External links
 Bob Holthus profile at Oaklawn Park

1934 births
2011 deaths
People from Pawnee County, Nebraska
American horse trainers
People from Garland County, Arkansas